Xiong Guobao (born 1 November 1962) is a former elite-level badminton player from China who won numerous international singles titles in the late 1980s.

Career 
Noted for his solid, consistent play, Xiong rarely suffered lopsided defeats. His titles included the United States (1984), Japan (1987), Hong Kong (1987), Malaysian (1988, 1989), Thailand (1988), French (1989), Swedish (1988), and Indonesian (1989) Opens. He also won the (now defunct) season ending World Badminton Grand Prix tourney in 1987 and in 1989. Along with fellow singles stars Yang Yang and Zhao Jianhua, Xiong helped China's Thomas Cup (men's international) teams capture consecutive world titles in 1986, 1988, and 1990. His results in IBF World Championships were somewhat disappointing, losing quarterfinal matches to Icuk Sugiarto and Eddy Kurniawan respectively in the 1987 and 1989 editions of the tourney.

Personal life 
Xiong married to Qian Ping, his teammates from Jiangxi provincial team in Nanchang in 1991. But after eleven years of marriage, they divorced in 2002.

Achievements

World Cup 
Men's singles

IBF World Grand Prix 
The World Badminton Grand Prix sanctioned by International Badminton Federation (IBF) from 1983 to 2006.

Men's singles

Invitational tournament 
Men's singles

References 

1962 births
Living people
Badminton players from Jiangxi
Chinese male badminton players
Badminton players at the 1986 Asian Games
Badminton players at the 1990 Asian Games
Asian Games gold medalists for China
Asian Games silver medalists for China
Asian Games bronze medalists for China
Medalists at the 1986 Asian Games
Medalists at the 1990 Asian Games
Asian Games medalists in badminton
World No. 1 badminton players